Cinygmula is a genus of flatheaded mayflies in the family Heptageniidae. There are at least 30 described species in Cinygmula.

Species
These 33 species belong to the genus Cinygmula:

 Cinygmula adusta (Imanishi, 1935) c g
 Cinygmula brunnea Tiunova, 1990 c g
 Cinygmula cava (Ulmer, 1927) c g
 Cinygmula dorsalis (Imanishi, 1935) c g
 Cinygmula gartrelli McDunnough, 1934 i c g
 Cinygmula hirasana (Imanishi, 1935) c g
 Cinygmula hutchinsoni (Traver, 1939) c g
 Cinygmula inermis Braasch, 1983 c g
 Cinygmula irina Tshernova & Belov, 1982 c g
 Cinygmula joosti Braasch, 1977 c g
 Cinygmula kootenai McDunnough, 1943 i c g
 Cinygmula kurenzovi (Bajkova, 1965) c g
 Cinygmula levanidovi Tshernova & Belov, 1982 c g
 Cinygmula malaisei (Ulmer, 1927) c g
 Cinygmula mimus (Eaton, 1885) i c g
 Cinygmula minuta Braasch, 1980 c g
 Cinygmula oreophila Kustareva, 1978 c g
 Cinygmula par (Eaton, 1885) i c g
 Cinygmula picta Braasch & Soldán, 1979 c g
 Cinygmula putoranica Kluge, 1980 c g
 Cinygmula quadripunctata Braasch & Soldán, 1980 c g
 Cinygmula ramaleyi (Dodds, 1923) i c g
 Cinygmula reticulata McDunnough, 1934 i c g
 Cinygmula rougemonti Braasch & Soldán, 1987 c g
 Cinygmula sapporensis (Matsumura, 1904) c g
 Cinygmula subaequalis (Banks, 1914) i c g b
 Cinygmula tarda (McDunnough, 1929) i c g
 Cinygmula tetramera g
 Cinygmula tioga Mayo, 1952 i c g
 Cinygmula unicolorata Tshernova, 1979 c g
 Cinygmula uniformis McDunnough, 1934 i c g
 Cinygmula vernalis (Imanishi, 1935) c g
 Cinygmula zimmermanni Braasch, 1977 c g

Data sources: i = ITIS, c = Catalogue of Life, g = GBIF, b = Bugguide.net

References

Further reading

 
 
 
 
 
 

Mayfly genera